was a Japanese TV show with attached female idol group created by Fuji TV. The concept of the group was to watch as the girls grow as idols and experience various things. Idoling's main source of exposure was their TV show, which aired several new episodes every week on FUJI TV ONE, with more than 1000 episodes broadcast since October 30, 2006. Over the years of the show, Idoling!!! released 7 studio albums, 24 singles, collaborated with other idol groups (such as AKB48), released DVD specials and gave many live performances and concerts. The group officially disbanded on October 27, 2015, with the graduation of all remaining members.

History

2006 - 2010
In October, 2006 auditions were held for 50 people in agencies, and 9 idols were chosen out of them. The audition videos were released on a DVD that accompanied their first single, while the members' first meet-and-greet was featured on the DVD that accompanied their first album, Daiji na Mono.

On March 3, 2008, it was announced that new members would join the group, and then on March 31, on Fuji Television's official site, photos, names and ages of the new members were revealed. With the addition of new members, the group doubled to 18 members until Maia Kobayashi (#10) left shortly after her debut to focus on her education.

On January 18, 2009, Rumi Koizumi (#2) announced her graduation from Idoling!!! due in part to health concerns. Soon after, it was announced that Sayaka Kato (#1), Maria Eto (#4), Mira Takiguchi (#5) and Michelle Miki (#18) would all graduate from Idoling!!! in March 2009.  Shortly after the departure of these members, three new members were added to commemorate the official third generation of Idoling!!!: Yurika Tachibana (#19), Ai Ōkawa (#20) and Idoling!!!'s youngest member yet, Kaede Hashimoto (#21).

On October 1, 2009, Idoling!!! opened auditions for its fourth generation to debut in Spring 2010, with the audition process carrying on into February 2010. The new members were announced on March 6.  In April 2010, the new fourth generation members were introduced in the show: Ruka Kurata (#22), Yūna Itō (#23), Manami Nomoto (#24), Kaoru Gotō (#25) and Chika Ojima (#26).

2011 
In February 2011, all members left Japan for the first time, and went to Taiwan. They did a small live promotion, broadcast on TV, for the release of their third album SUNRISE in Taiwan. This marks their first official release outside Japan.

On April 12, 2011, it was announced that Kaoru Gotō (#25) would take a six-month hiatus from Idoling!!! to deal with a family emergency.  At the end of April 2011, Idoling!!! appeared on their second regular program, "Fuji TV Kara no~!" with host Yamazaki of the comedy duo, "Untouchable".  At the end of August 2011 Kaoru Gotō (#25) returned from her hiatus and on Tokyo Idol Festival 2011 appeared on stage with the group.  On October 1, 2011, Idoling!!! opened auditions for its fifth generation to debut in Spring 2012, with the audition process carrying until the end of November. The 15 finalists were presented at their eleventh live concert on December 4, 2011. The fans voted through a voting ID that comes with Idoling's 17th single "MAMORE!!!". The new members were announced during an event in February.

October 2011 saw the release of Idoling!!!'s first international collaboration on the fourth single from the album Smash of French DJ Martin Solveig with the song "Big In Japan", which also featured Canadian electronic music band Dragonette. A music video with Idoling!!! was released in October 2011. Shortly afterwards Idoling!!! released a video thanking Martin Solveig and expressed their wish to go to France.  Just a week after their 11th Live, on December 11, 2011 Erika Yazawa (#7) and Phongchi (#8) announced their graduation from the group to pursue a career as talents. On December 23 a final graduation live concert was held. Neither of them were included in the single "MAMORE!!!".

2012
On March 2, 2012, the new fifth generation members were introduced on the show: Kurumi Takahashi (#27), Karen Ishida (#28), Ramu Tamagawa (#29), and Reia Kiyoku (#30).

On April 17, 2012, Fuji TV announced partnership with Google YouTube, including the Idoling!!! official YouTube channel. During press conference, Idoling!!! greeted in 15 languages.  On May 9, 2012, the Idoling!!! official Facebook page was created but not yet active until July 19.

On May 30, 2012, Suzuka Morita officially graduated from Idoling!!!. Graduation Live was held on the same day at Zepp DiverCity Tokyo.  On June 3, 2012, Idoling!!! started their first tour titled .  On June 25, 2012, Idoling!!! took part in Yubi Matsuri, an idol festival produced by Rino Sashihara from AKB48. The concert was held at Nippon Budokan before a crowd of 8,000 people and featured such girl groups as Shiritsu Ebisu Chugaku, Super Girls, Tokyo Girls' Style, Nogizaka46, Passpo, Buono!, Momoiro Clover Z, and Watarirouka Hashiritai 7.  On August 5, 2012, Idoling!!! announced their 12th Live to be held at NHK Hall on November 25. On August 10, 2012, Idoling!!! broadcast their 900th episode of their TV show on FUJI TV ONE.

On September 7, 2012, Idoling!!! sold a muffler towel with emblem design that resembled the emblem of J-League "Cerezo Osaka" Football Club. The item soon dropped from official website after being confirmed by Cerezo Osaka official. A few days later, Cerezo Osaka and Idoling!!! announced special collaboration. On September 20, during Cerezo Osaka vs F.C. Tokyo match fixture at Cerezo Osaka home ground "Kincho Stadium", five Idoling!!! members (#19 Tachibana, #20 Ōkawa, #22 Kurata, #23 Itō, #28 Ishida) performed three songs before the match at the main entrance and one song during the half-time at the pitch. All members wearing specially designed Cerezo Osaka uniform and to be called "Cerezo na Idoling!!!", except only Tachibana who was wearing F.C. Tokyo uniform due to her being F.C. Tokyo supporter, F.C. Tokyo TV show assistant and reporter.

On November 5, 2012, Idoling!!! announced official Niconico Channel.  On December 26, 2012, #24 Nomoto announced graduation from Idoling!!! and retirement from entertainment business due to family circumstance.

2013
On January 18, all of the first generation members held a reunion live as they promised 5 years ago at Fuji TV Kyutai studio. Currently from the original nine members, six of them are already graduated from the group. On this event, they also talked about the inside story of the group's past. It was broadcast live on FUJI TV ONE titled . They promised to do a reunion event again in 2023.

On April 13, Rurika Yokoyama (#9) announced her solo debut at Idoling!!! Nishi e! Higashi e! Mystery Tour-ng!!! in Zepp Tokyo. A few months later on June 1, Mai Endō (#3) announced her solo debut at the tour final with a video message from Takanori Nishikawa.

On May 24, Idoling!!! celebrated their TV show's 1000th episode.

On June 27, Idoling!!! Producer, Seita Kadosawa, announced to leave his position in Idoling!!! project. Kadosawa stated that the Idoling!!! new members (6th generation) audition and the Idoling!!! 20th single "Summer Lion" are under the new Producer's management.

On July 8, it was revealed that the former Fuji TV show "Quiz! Hexagon" producer, Takashi Kanbara, is the new Idoling!!! Producer.

On July 17, Idoling!!! performed two songs at Ajinomoto Stadium before the J-league match between F.C. Tokyo against Ventforet Kofu. A few weeks later on August 28, Idoling!!! 20th Single "Summer Lion" melody was used by F.C. Tokyo supporters as one of their football chants for the first time during the match against Sagan Tosu.

On July 28, Idoling!!! 6th generation members, later to be called as Neo generation, were introduced at Tokyo Idol Festival 2013. They are Mayu Furuhashi (#31), Mayu Sekiya (#32), Ruka Hashimoto (#33), Rena Satō (#34), and Michaela Wako Satō (#35). It was revealed that Ruka Hashimoto is Kaede Hashimoto's real younger sister.

On August 28, a new group was announced and will be called as 'Idoling NEO'. Yūna Itō will also be transferring to this new group, later followed by Kaoru Gotō. It was also announced that both Idoling!!! and Idoling NEO will release a single on the same day sometime during November 2013. It will be a competition of who will rank the highest on the Oricon chart.

On December 8, it was announced during their 13th live concert that current leader Mai Endō would be graduating from the group on February 14, 2014, during a graduation live at Zepp DiverCity in Tokyo. After her graduation she will focus on her solo career.

2015

On February 28, it was announced that Idoling!!! would disband on October 27.

Members
As of December 23, 2014, Idoling!!! had twenty one active members.

Former members

Timeline 

 Black - hiatus
 Yuna Ito, Kaoru Goto, and the NEO generation members performed as "Idoling NEO," a separate subunit of Idoling!!!

Discography

Idoling!!! Singles

* Data provided by Oricon Charts.

Idoling NEO Singles

* Data provided by Oricon Charts.

Albums
 2008.02.27 - Daiji na Mono
 2009.08.19 - Petit-Petit
 2010.03.03 - SUNRISE
 2011.02.11 - Sunrise (Taiwan Edition)
 2011.03.16 - SISTERS
 2014.01.08 - GOLD EXPERIENCE

Collaborations

1 Each group exchanged a song. Idoling!!! performed the AKB48 song "Aitakatta" while AKB48 performed the Idoling!!! song "Moteki no Uta".
2 Each participating group represented one member. Idoling!!! was represented by #19 Yurika Tachibana.

Filmography

Live and Concert
 2008.06.18 - Idoling!!! 1st Live "Motto Ganbare Otome(Warai)"
 2008.06.18 - Idoling!!! 2nd Live "Daiji na Mono"
 2008.10.31 - Idoling!!! in Bouken'ou Final ~uRa no Ura Made Micchaku ng!!!~
 2009.01.14 - Idoling!!! 3rd Live "Kimeru Nara Kono Natsussung!!!"
 2009.06.24 - Idoling!!! 4th Live "Nanika ga Okoru Yokan ga...ng!!!"
 2009.07.01 - Idoling!!! Sotsugyou Live ~Aratanaru Tabidaching!!!~
 2009.10.21 - Idoling!!! in Odaiba Gasshuukoku ~uRa no Ura Made Micchakung!!!~
 2009.12.25 - Idoling!!! Hachitama Live '09 SPRING
 2010.04.21 - Idoling!!! 6th Live "Ya!O!ng!!!"
 2010.05.19 - Idoling!!! Hachitama Live Autumn to Christmas
 2010.07.07 - Idoling!!! 7th Live "Jinsei=Shugyounaring!!!"
 2010.09.01 - Idoling!!! Hachitama Live '10 Winter & Audition
 2010.11.17 - Idoling!!! 8th Live "Kono Kimochi wa Sou da Are da Koinandeshou ng!!!"
 2010.12.22 - Idoling!!!×YGA Shinahachi Live in Shinagawa Yoshimoto Prince Theater & Osaka NGK
 2011.02.09 - TOKYO IDOL FESTIVAL 2010
 2011.05.18 - Idoling!!! 9th Live "Bonnou no Kazu dake Ai ga Aru! Oshougatsu eve ng!!!"
 2011.11.16 - Idoling!!! 10th Live "Kangaeruna. Kanjirou! GO AHEADng!!!"
 2012.01.27 - TOKYO IDOL FESTIVAL 2011 Eco&Smile feat. Idoling!!!
 2012.06.06 - Idoling!!! 11th Live "Meccha Chikaizo! Big Egg ng!!!" (Blu-ray)
 2012.12.19 - Idoling!!! Hatsu da! Tour da! ZEPPng!!! special contents Morita Suzuka Namida no Sotsugyō Live (Blu-ray)
 2013.03.01 - TOKYO IDOL FESTIVAL 2012 feat. Idoling!!!
 2013.05.24 - Idoling!!! 12th Live "Nice de Hot na Kiss shichaitai!Ryakushite NHK-ng!!!" (Blu-ray)
 2013.09.18 - Idoling!!! Nishi e! Higashi e!! Mistery Tour-ng!!! 2013

Gravure DVD
 2009.11.18 - Idoling!!! in Okinawa Manza Beach ~Gravure Idol no DVDtte Koko Made Yaranainjya...ng!!!~
 2009.02.04 - Idoling!!! in Ishigakijima ~Gravure Idol no DVDppokushitemimashita ng!!!
 2009.03.18 - Idoling!!! in Ishigakijima ~Idolppokunai uRa no Bubun mo Misechau ng!!!~
 2009.11.18 - Idoling!!! in Okinawa Manza Beach ~Gravure Idol no DVDtte Kokomade Yaranainjya...ng!!!~
 2010.02.17 - Idoling!!! in Okinawa Manza Beach ~Idolppokunai uRa no Bubun Made Mata Mata Misechau ng!!!~
 2010.10.13 - Idoling!!! in Okinawa Manza Beach 2010 Gravure Idol no DVDppoidesukedo Karada wo Hatte Yattemasu ng!!!
 2010.12.01 - Idoling!!! in Okinawa Manza Beach 2010 Natsu ~Idolppokunai uRa no Ura no Ura Made Misechau ng!!! URAHHH!~
 2011.12.21 - Guam Idoling!!! Gravure Idol no DVDppoku Guam Battemasu Guam dake ni ng!!!
 2012.02.24 - Guam Idoling!!! Idolppokunai uRa no Ura mo Mada Mada Guam Batte Misechau! Guam dake ni ng!!!
 2012.11.21 - Ishigaki Idoling!!! Gravure Idol no Blu-rayppokushitemimashitang!!! Kimi to Ita Natsu (Blu-ray)
 2013.01.16 - Ishigaki Idoling!!! 2012 Idolppokunai uRa no Ura mo Mada Mada Misechau-ng!!! (Blu-ray)
 2013.07.26 - Idoling!!! Minami no Shima Tsuini Yume no Hawaii ni Kichaimashita-ng!!!

Video Collection
 2009.03.18 - Idoling!!! MUSIC VIDEO COLLECTION 2007-2009 Soko Soko Tamattande Dashichaimasu ng!!!
 2011.09.21 - Idoling!!! Music Video Collection 2 2009-2011

Limited Release DVD
 2008.07.28 - Odaiba Bouken'ou Final Limited Edition "Idoling!!! no Natsu Yasuming!!!" ~Asa kara Hiru Hen~
 2008.07.28 - Odaiba Bouken'ou Final Limited Edition "Idoling!!! no Natsu Yasuming!!!" ~Hiru kara Yoru Hen~
 2009.07.27 - Odaiba Gasshuukoku Limited Edition "Idoling!!! no Natsu Yasuming!!! 2009" Part1 and Part2
 2009.08.11 - Odaiba Gasshuukoku Limited Edition "Idoling!!! no Natsu Yasuming!!! 2009" Part3 and Part4, "Kyoufu no Jitsuwa Kaidan...Idoling Mimi Fukuro!!! Kore wa Gachi desu".
 2010.07.17 - Odaiba Gasshuukoku Limited Edition "Idoling!!! no Natsu Yasuming!!! 2010" Part1 and Part2
 2010.08.14 - Odaiba Gasshuukoku Limited Edition "Idoling!!! no Natsu Yasuming!!! 2010" Part3, "Maji Naki Member Zokushutsu... Idoling!!! Kimodameshing!!!" and Part4, "Kyoufu no Jitsuwa Kaidan...Idoling Mimi Fukuro!!! Kore wa Gachi desu".
 2011.07.17 - Odaiba Gasshuukoku Limited Edition "Idoling!!! no Natsu Yasuming!!! 2011" Part1 and Part2
 2011.08.15 - Odaiba Gasshuukoku Limited Edition "Idoling!!! no Natsu Yasuming!!! 2011" Part3, "Honki de Yarimasu... Idoling!!! Hyaku Monogatari!!! & Tokunatsu Island Basket Hen" and Part4, "Honki de Yarimasu... Idoling!!! Hyaku Monogatari!!! Sono Ni & Tokunatsu Island Mattari Talk Hen"
 2012.07.21 - Odaiba Gasshuukoku Limited Edition "Idoling!!! no Natsu Yasuming!!! 2012" Part1 and Part2
 2012.08.16 - Odaiba Gasshuukoku Limited Edition "Idoling!!! no Natsu Yasuming!!! 2012" Part3 and Part4

Blu-ray
 2010.12.24 - Idoling!!! 3Dng de Blu-rayng!!!
 2011.09.21 - Idoling!!! Music Video Collection 2 2009-2011
 2012.07.18 - Guam Idoling!!! 3D de Tobideruyouni Guam Battemasu Guam Dakeni-ng!!!

DVD BOX 
 2008.06.27 - Idoling!!! Season1 DVD BOX (3 discs), contains episode 1–30 with extra footage
 2008.11.28 - Idoling!!! Season2 DVD BOX (6 discs), contains episode 31–130 with extra footage
 2009.04.15 - Idoling!!! Season3 DVD BOX (6 discs), contains episode 131–230 with extra footage
 2009.09.02 - Idoling!!! Season4 DVD BOX (6 discs), contains episode 231–326 with extra footage
 2010.03.17 - Idoling!!! Season5 DVD BOX (6 discs), contains episode 327–404 with extra footage
 2010.06.16 - Idoling!!! Season6 DVD BOX (6 discs), contains episode 405–443 with extra footage
 2010.10.29 - Idoling!!! Season7 DVD BOX (6 discs), contains episode 444–481 with extra footage
 2010.12.15 - Idoling!!! Season8 DVD BOX (6 discs), contains episode 482–519 with extra footage
 2011.04.27 - Idoling!!! Season9 DVD BOX (6 discs), contains episode 520–560 with extra footage
 2011.09.21 - Idoling!!! Season10 DVD BOX (6 discs), contains episode 561–602 with extra footage
 2012.03.07 - Idoling!!! Season11 DVD BOX (6 discs), contains episode 603–639 with extra footage
 2012.06.29 - Idoling!!! Season12 DVD BOX (6 discs), contains episode 641–680 with extra footage
 2012.10.17 - Idoling!!! Season13 DVD BOX (6 discs), contains episode 681–712 with extra footage
 2013.03.20 - Idoling!!! Season14 DVD BOX (6 discs), contains episode 718–748 with extra footage
 2013.06.28 - Idoling!!! Season15 DVD BOX (6 discs), contains episode 750–794 with extra footage

SD Card 
 2010.12.31 - Resort Idoling!!! Asobi Tsukaretashi Amai Mono Demo Tabeyo
 2010.12.31 - Resort Idoling!!! Sekkaku Kitandashisa Umi e Ikouyo

Other
 2010.03.24 - Yoshimoto Prince Theater Opening Kinen Live 6DAYS "Ninki Geinin vs Idol"
 2010.03.24 - Yoshimoto Prince Theater Opening Kinen Live 6DAYS "Yoshimoto Shin Kigeki with Idol"
 2011.07.20 - Fushigi no Kuni no Idoling!!! ~Sunda Hitomi de Itai Kara~
 2012.04.18 - Gekidan Idoling!!! First Performance "Peron ~Tokusen Karubi 7 nin Mae wo Peron~"

Other releases

Photobook 
 2008.03.14 - Idoling!!! Visual Blog "Nitsumarimasu!"
 2008.06.04 - B.L.T Special Edition IDOLING!!! LIVE 2008 "Daiji na mono"
 2008.12.12 - Idoling!!! in Ishigakijima
 2008.08.28 - Idoling!!! Go Ikkou Sama
 2010.10.01 - Idoling!!! San
 2010.12.06 - Motto Idoling!!! Official Guide
 2011.11.06 - Idoling!!! Four in Guam
 2012.04.18 - Idoling!!! no Working!!!
 2012.10.19 - Idoling!!! GO↑GO↑
 2013.07.19 - Idoling!!! Mugyutto Hawaii

Song Tie Ups and Collaborations

Anime 
 Katekyo Hitman Reborn! Ending Theme Song(2007.7.7 - 2007.9.29): friend
 FAIRY TAIL Opening Theme Song(Episode 12 - 24): S.O.W. Sense Of Wonder
 FAIRY TAIL Ending Theme Song(Episode 86 - 98): Don't Think. Feel!!!

Games 
 Konami Tokimeki Memorial 4 (PSP) Opening Theme Song: Te no Hira no Yuki
 Sega Puyo Puyo 7 (PSP/NDS/Wii) Image Song: Love Magic Fever
 Sony LittleBigPlanet 2 (PS3) CM Song: Yarakai Heart
 Sega Puyo Puyo!! 20th Anniversary Support Song: Koi no 20 Rensa!!
 Square-Enix "Sengoku IXA" Special Event (August 2 - September 1, 2010)
 Fuji TV & Cyber Agent "Dream Sengokuden ~Kibō no Miko~" Special Collaboration (April 18, 2011 - July 19, 2012)
 Pocelabo "Yakyutomo!" Special Collaboration (October 15 - November 4, 2010)
 Kurohyō 2: Ryū ga Gotoku Ashura-hen in-game characters (#3 Endō, #6 Tonooka, #19 Tachibana)
 Collaboration with MMORPG "Trickster"
 Collaboration with mobile mahjong game "Jyannabi Yonin Mahjong Online"
 GREE "IDOL☆J@M"
 NEC BIGLOBE "Yome Collection Idol" (February 21, 2013 – present)

TV Show 
 Fuji TV "Kiseki Taiken! Unbelievable" Ending Theme Song(2009.4 - 7): baby blue
 Fuji TV "Raion no Gokigenyo" Ending Theme Song(2009.6.29 -): Mujouken Koufuku
 Fuji TV "Kiseki Taiken! Unbelievable" Ending Theme Song(2010.1 - 3): Don't be afraid
 Fuji TV "Kiseki Taiken! Unbelievable" Ending Theme Song(2011.1 - 3): Queen Bee ~Shoujo no Jidai Kara~
 CBC "Otakara Hasshin Tower DAI-NAMO" Ending Theme Song: Konayuki ga Mau Machinami de
 Fuji TV "Kiseki Taiken! Unbelievable" Ending Theme Song(2012.1 - 3): MAMORE!!!
 TBS Hanamaru Market Ending Theme Song(2012.1 - 3): Sara Sara Kyutiko
 TV Asahi "music-ru TV" Opening Theme Song (2013.11): Shout!!!
 NST "Smile Stadium" Ending Theme Song (2013.12): Shout!!!

Movie 
 Pyokotan Profile Ending Theme Song: Lemon Drop

Event 
 HOT☆FANTASY ODAIBA 2007-2008 Image song: Snow celebration
 ROBO_JAPAN 2008 Image Song: Tokimeki Dreaming!!!
 HOT☆FANTASY ODAIBA 2008-2009 Image Song: Hannin wa Anata Desu, NAGARA
 Idol Championship "Push★1" Image Song: Beta na Shitsuren ~Shibuya ni Furu Yuki~, Harukanaru Virgin Road
 Fuji TV Winter Festival 2013: Samui Yoru Dakara...

Software 
 Microsoft Windows Vista "Vista Gakuen" Campaign Song: Kokuhaku

TV Commercial 
 Ryū ga Gotoku OF THE END local TV commercial
 Marudai Shokuhin "Ganbare! Nippon!" Campaign Song(April 1 - May 31, 2012): Megami no Pulse
 P&G "Febreze"(2013)
 Glico "Caplico" (2013)

Other Collaborations 
 Collaboration with Sony VAIO
 Collaboration with Microsoft Digital Quiz on Koto no Pa!
 Collaboration with Yahoo!Japan "Net Bandzuke 2010"
 Collaboration with Flash Animation "Naked Wolves"
 Collaboration with Hewlett-Packard Japan
 Tokyo Polytechnic University Future Exhibition 2009 Special Supporter
 Ōiso Prince Hotel, Ōiso Long Beach 55th Anniversary Campaign Girl
 Collaboration with WACOM "Tenohira Animal Land" (July 4 - August 6, 2012) 
 Collaboration with fashion brand VANQUISH for Idoling!!! 12th Live Limited Edition T-shirt (October 26 - November 25, 2012) 
 Collaboration with Glico Giant Caplico "Caplico Queen Ketteisen" (October 27 - December 9, 2012) 
 Collaboration with Cedyna, Cedyna Card (June 27, 2013 – present)

Live and Event Participation

Numbering Lives

Fixed-term Lives
 Hachitama Live (April 2009 - March 2010)
Hachitama live was held once a month at Fuji TV Kyutai Studio, a studio inside the spherical structure on top of Fuji TV's headquarter in Odaiba, Tokyo. Special live was held twice outside the Kyutai Studio. 
 Hachitama Live SP Idoling!!! in Oiso Long Beach, was held in Oiso Long Beach resort in Kanagawa Prefecture.
 Idoling!!! 4th Generation Final Audition, was held in Yoshimoto Prince Theater.
 Shinahachi Live (April 2010 - November 2011)
Shinahachi Live was held several times a month at Yoshimoto Prince Theater in Shinagawa, Tokyo. It is a joint-live with Yoshimoto's idol group YGA. Special live was held three times at Namba Grand Kagetsu (NGK) in Osaka.
 Jukuhachi Live (December 2011 -  July 2012)
Jukuhachi Live was held once a month at Lumine the Yoshimoto in Shinjuku, Tokyo. It is the continuation of the joint-live with YGA which was moved from Yoshimoto Prince Theater due to the closing down of the property. Special live was held once at Namba Grand Kagetsu in Osaka.
 Shibuhachi Live (September 2012 – present)
Shibuhachi Live is held several times a month at Mt. Rainier Hall Shibuya Pleasure Pleasure in Shibuya, Tokyo. The "Namagoe live" performance, a live singing without microphone, was introduced in this live as one of the main attractions.
 Nicohachi Live (November 2011 – present)
Nicohachi Live is held twice a month at Nicofarre in Roppongi, Tokyo. The live is divided in two sessions in one day performance, from 18:30 - 21:30 local time. The live is broadcast on Niconico namahousou for 1,600 niconico point for both sessions. Viewer will have the right to watch the backstage live broadcast in between the sessions. The "Nicohachi enquête" was introduced in this live, where viewer can do a live vote for related questionnaire, usually "which song to be performed next" or "which member to perform the next song". Viewer can also do a live comment during the live, and all comments will be shown up on the screen at the stage, Nicofarre, which features LED wall surrounding the stage.

Events

 TOKYO IDOL FESTIVAL 2010 (2010.08.07-08)
 Tokyo Earth Ride 2010 (2010.10.11)
 TOKYO EARTH WORKERS collection 2011 (2011.01.23)
 TOKYO IDOL FESTIVAL 2011 (2011.08.27-28)
 EKIDEN for PEACE 2011 (2011.10.02) - Live performance and relay race.
 TOKYO EARTH WORKERS collection 2012 (2012.02.12)
 EXIT TUNES ACADEMY　-EXIT TUNES 10th ANNIVERSARY SPECIAL- in Saitama Super Arena (2012.05.06) - Opening act.
 Yubi Matsuri ~Idol Rinji Soukai~ in Nippon Budokan produced by HKT48 Rino Sashihara (2012.06.25)
 Japan Expo 2012 (2012.07.07) - Live performance and handshake event.
 TOKYO IDOL FESTIVAL 2012 (2012.08.04-05)
 a-nation musicweek IDOL NATION in Yoyogi National Gymnasium (2012.08.11)
 Inazuma Rock Fes. 2012 (2012.09.15) - Live performance at the free area only
 TOKYO IDOL FESTIVAL 2013 (2013.07.27-28)
 a-nation IDOL NATION 2013 (2013.08.10)
 a-nation stadium fest. 2013 (2013.08.31) - Opening act
 Koyabu Sonic 2013 (2013.09.15)

Awards
 Lohas Design Award 2010 Special Prize for "Eco Idoling!!!"
 Lohas Design Award 2011 Special Prize for Social game "Dream Sengokuden ~Kibō no Miko~"

Subgroups

2008/12 — 2009/01

1 The missing heart in the Hannin wa Anata Desu PV can be seen in the PV for Na•Ga•Ra

2009/12

1 Morita did not appear in the PV.

2010/11
In the fall of 2010, the 20 members were divided into pairs to form 10 groups. Fans then voted on which duo would perform their own track on the next single. Team Gakuran was the winner and performed the track "Ichikoi" on the Yarakai Heart single.

In Summer 2010, a song "Makehende" was introduced at Shinahachi Live in NGK. The song was originally written only for this event but due to demand from fans, the song then applied to USEN Music Program. The song entered USEN ranking top 50 and decided to be included in Idoling!!! 4th album "SISTERS" released in 2011 . A music video then created after the song managed to enter top 30.

Idoling!!! Programs 
Idoling!!! TV show is airing in three different medias; the CS, the On Demand, and the Terrestrial broadcast. Each has different packaging.

Fuji TV CS
The Idoling!!! program started on October 30, 2006, airing every weekday on two Fuji TV's satellite channels, Fuji TV 739 (also formerly on Fuji TV 721) and Fuji TV CSHD. On this version, the TV show is unedited. Since 2009, the show is airing two and three times per week. Since the show is unedited, mistakes and happenings can be seen sometimes throughout the show, for example was episode 459.
The show is a variety show, making each airing different. However, there are a few recurring core segments.

Other segments 
These segments are fairly new or do not appear as frequently as the above. Segments will often gain temporary popularity with the staff and fans, resulting in recurring airings for a short period, followed by a period where the once-popular segment does not air at all.

Fuji TV On Demand
Fuji TV On Demand is a paid streaming service. The On Demand duration of each episode depends on the filming, sometimes it can be 40 minutes long with the first 27 minutes the same as broadcast on the CS version. On Demand currently streams in MP4 format (1280x720 pixels, 2000 kbit/s bitrate).

Fuji TV Terrestrial
The terrestrial channel is known as Fuji TV main channel(CX), which is free but only available around Tokyo. Idoling!!! show in this broadcast is edited to fit the 30 minutes slot with commercials, sometimes cramped two CS episodes into one. The edit includes narration, additional captions, and extra segment which is not available on other broadcasts. One of those segments is ARG started on December 29, 2012.

uRaIdoling!!!
uRaIdoling is a special collection of Idoling episodes available only to fanclub members. These episodes feature a behind-the-scenes look at the various activities of the members (and occasionally the staff) when they are not filming the main show. These episodes are not constrained to any format and cover topics and subjects with no specificity. Some examples of episodes include visiting member's houses, cooking with members, games or discussions between small groups of members, solo interviews, photo-shoot documentaries, and PV "making of" documentaries.

Gekkan Idoling!!!
Gekkan Idoling can be considered Idoling's monthly specials. These episodes feature off-location activities such as cooking lessons, camping trips, games. They are similar to uRaIdoling in their miscellaneousness, though they are longer in length and feature most, if not all, members.
The full episodes were later released in a longer format on DVD for fan club members. After a year, Gekkan Idoling!!! became a direct-to-DVD production without TV broadcast.

Idoling!!! YouTube Channel
Since April 17, 2012, Idoling!!! started its official YouTube channel. Other than streaming old collections of TV show episode and Gekkan Idoling!!!, it also streams 2–3 minutes video called  every weekday, and 10 minutes video called  every week. Daily Idoling!!! features member(s) daily activity, free talk, event report, etc. Weekly Idoling!!! features member(s) doing some challenge segment, field report, promotion video making-of, etc.

Related People

MC
 Bakarhythm (Hidetomo Masuno) (2006—present)

Fuji TV Announcer
 Sayaka Morimoto (2006—present)
 Maiko Saito (2006—present)
 Saori Ishimoto (2006—2007)
 Yōko Shōno (2007—2009)
 Reiko Endō (2008—2009)
 Sara Hosogai (2010—2011)
 Yurika Mita (2011)

TV Staff
 Takeshi Shimada (Chief Director)
 Yosuke Mori (Director)
 Seita Kadosawa (General Producer and Director, also the group's producer)(~2013)
 Shun'ya Hamada (Producer) (~2013)

References

External links

 Official Site(2006.10.30 ~ 2012.07.19) - Fuji TV
 Official Site(2012.07.19 ~ Present) - Fuji TV
 Official Site - Pony Canyon

 
Japanese girl groups
Japanese pop rock music groups
Japanese dance music groups
Japanese idol groups
Japanese music television series
Pony Canyon artists
Japanese pop music groups
Musical groups established in 2006
2006 establishments in Japan
Fuji TV original programming
Musical groups from Tokyo